Brahea pimo is a species of flowering plant in the family Arecaceae. It is found only in Mexico. It is threatened by habitat loss.

References

pimo
Endemic flora of Mexico
Flora of Guerrero
Flora of Jalisco
Flora of Michoacán
Flora of Nayarit
Taxa named by Odoardo Beccari
Taxonomy articles created by Polbot